The Protoplane Ultra is a French ultralight aircraft, designed and produced by Protoplane of Bagnères-de-Bigorre. The aircraft is supplied as a complete ready-to-fly aircraft.

Design and development
The Ultra was designed as a highly efficient aircraft, to comply with the Fédération Aéronautique Internationale microlight rules. It features a cantilever low-wing, a two-seats-in-side-by-side configuration enclosed cockpit under a bubble canopy, fixed tricycle landing gear with wheel pants and a single engine in tractor configuration.

The aircraft is made from composites. The standard engine provided is the  Jabiru 2200 four-stroke powerplant.

The Ultra achieves a fuel economy of 12L/h (43 mpg) at 220 km/h (137 mph) through aerodynamic refinements and use of composites.

Variants
Ultra
Gasoline-powered version equipped with an  Jabiru 2200 four-stroke powerplant
Ultra-e
Electric aircraft variant under development.

Specifications (Ultra)

References

External links

2000s French ultralight aircraft
Single-engined tractor aircraft